The 25th European Film Awards were presented on 1 December 2012 in Valletta, Malta. The winners were selected by over 2,500 members of the European Film Academy.

Winners and nominees

Best Film

Best Animated Feature Film
The nominees for Best Animated Feature Film were selected by a committee consisting of EFA Board Members and representatives from the European Association of Animation Film.

European Film Award for Achievement in World Cinema 
 Helen Mirren

People's Choice Award
The winner of the People's Choice Award was selected by online votes.

References

2012 in Malta
European
European Film Awards ceremonies
2012 in Europe